Bhai Mahi Singh (died 9 September 1712) was a Sikh martyr.

Family history 
Bhai Mahi Singh belonged to the Kamboj (joshan) landlord family of Sunam. He had taken Amrit from Guru Gobind Singh at the time of the Vaisakhi of 1699. He was the son of Bhai Bhikha Singh, grandson of Bhai Murari, great-grandson of Bhai Bhura, and great-great-grandson of Bhai Sukhia Mandan of Ladwa.

General Madan Khan's raid of Anandpur 

Once Guru Gobind Singh was holding his religious court at Anandpur Sahib and the kirtan service was being held. A Sikh scout brought the news that General Madan Khan from Gwalior had entered Anandpur for a showdown with the Sikhs and the Guru. Learning the news, Guru Gobind Singh announced it in the dewan (assembly) and asked for a brave man who could face and crush the pride of the haughty Madan Khan.

On hearing the announcement from the Guru, Bhai Mahi Singh immediately sought his permission and blessings to defeat Madan Khan.

General Madan Khan vs Bhai Mahi Singh 

Having received the permission of Guru Gobind Singh, Bhai Mahi Singh rode on his horse and reached Madan Khan's camp and challenged him to single combat. General Madan Khan agreed and chose to strike first, to which Bhai Mahi Singh consented. Madan Khan took a full and tremendous swing of his sword at Bhai Mahi Singh which the latter stopped with his shield. Madan Khan struck again and was again stopped by Bhai Mahi Singh; and for a third time with the same result.

Having been outwitted, General Madan Khan tried to play foul and therefore struck the fourth time against the rules of fair game but Bhai Mahi Singh, being alert and on his guard, took a full forceful swing of his double-edged sword at Madan Khan, beheading Khan. The blow was so powerful that it also shattered the shield of General Madan Khan. Seeing that their chieftain was dead, the five hundred soldiers of Madan Khan returned without taking further risk to fight with the Sikhs.

Appreciation from Guru Gobind Singh 

The news of the victory of Bhai Mahi Singh was broken to the congregation which received great applause from the Guru and the entire sangat.

Later, when Guru Gobind Singh had left Anandpur and landed in Malwa, he sent for Bhai Mahi Singh to meet him at Damdama Sahib. Bhai Mahi Singh complied with the Guru's instruction and reached Damdama Sahib forthwith. Once again acknowledging the role of Bhai Mahi Singh as a warrior, the tenth Guru offered him a Hukamnama (edict) in recognition of his meritorious services to the Guru Ghar (the House of the Guru) on 15 Srawan Samvat, 1763 (1706 AD). The first six lines on the Hukumnama Sahib were written by Guru Gobind Singh and were elaborated further by Bhai Mani Singh. The original copy of the Hukamnama is said to be still in the possession of the descendant, Surinder Pal Singh.

Martyrdom of Bhai Mahi Singh 

Bhai Mahi Singh later died, a martyr to the Sikh cause, while fighting valiantly at the Battle of Chappar Chiri under the standard of Banda Bahadur, twenty kilometres from Sirhind on May 12, 1710 AD. Another source states he was martyred on 9 September 1712 by being wrapped in cotton and being burnt to death in Samba alongside his brother, Bhai Dargahi Singh.

References

Indian Sikhs
Sikh martyrs
Sikh warriors
1710 deaths
Year of birth unknown